José María Alvarado (1813–1846)  was the son of Juan Bautista Alvarado (a soldier and cousin to the governor by the same name) and María Raimunda Yorba.

Life
Alvarado's grandfather, the elder Juan Bautista Alvarado, accompanied Gaspar de Portolà as an enlisted man in the Spanish Army in 1769. Alvarado's father, Juan Bautista Alvarado, was the grantee of Rancho Rincon del Diablo.

José María Alvarado married Lugarda Dionisia Osuna, daughter of Juan María Osuna. In 1840, Sgt. Alvarado was given Rancho Vallecitos de San Marcos Mexican land grant by his cousin, Governor Alvarado. The rancho was located in present San Marcos, California. In 1842, Alvarado was Suplente (Substitute Justice of the Peace) of San Diego.

During the Mexican–American War, Alvarado fought in the Battle of San Pasqual in 1846. After the battle, Alvarado was one of 11 men captured by an Indian band in the home of José Antonio Serrano, owner of Rancho Pauma. They were taken to an Indian ranchería at Agua Caliente, on Rancho San José, and killed in what was known as the Pauma Massacre. Alvarado's widow, Lugarda, later married Jesús Machado, who owned Rancho Buena Vista.

References

People from San Diego
1813 births
1846 deaths
People of Mexican California